The Mackay cabinet was the cabinet of the Netherlands from 21 April 1888 until 21 August 1891. The cabinet was formed by the Anti-Revolutionary Party (ARP), Independent Catholics (Ind. C.) and Independent Protestants (Ind. P.) after the election of 1888. The centre-right cabinet was a majority government in the House of Representatives. Aeneas Mackay of the Anti-Revolutionary Party was Prime Minister.

Cabinet Members

 Resigned.
 Appointment: Aeneas Mackay appointed as Minister of Colonial Affairs.

References

External links
Official

  Kabinet-Mackay Parlement & Politiek

Cabinets of the Netherlands
1888 establishments in the Netherlands
1891 disestablishments in the Netherlands
Cabinets established in 1888
Cabinets disestablished in 1891